Bambaroo is a rural locality in the Shire of Hinchinbrook, Queensland, Australia.

Geography 
Bambaroo has two distinct parts geographically.

The centre and north-east is low-lying flat land (approx 20 metres above sea level), drained by numerous small creeks which flow into the Coral Sea in neighbouring Orient and Coolbie. This freehold land is predominantly used to grow sugarcane. A cane tramway delivers harvested sugarcane to the local sugar mills at Victoria Plantation and Mackenade.

Abswold is a neighbourhood within the north-east of the locality.

The Bruce Highway and the North Coast railway line both enter the locality from the east (Coolbie) and exit to the north (Yuruga) travelling through this flat part of the locality. Historically, three railway stations serviced the locality (from north to south):

 Scrubview railway station, now abandoned
 Bambaroo railway station, servicing the town
 Abswold railway station, now abandoned

The south-western part of the locality is mountainous and undeveloped, rising up to 980 metres above sea level. This land is protected as Paluma Range National Park.

History 
Bambaroo State School opened on 3 November 1924, although it was not officially opened until 19 May 1925 by Thomas Wilson, the Minister of Public Instruction. It closed on 31 December 2016. It was at 10 Bambaroo School Road.

Education 
There are no schools in Bambaroo. The nearest government primary schools are Mutarnee State School in Mutarnee to the south-east and Toobanna State School in Toobanna to the north. The nearest government secondary school is Ingham State High School in Ingham to the north.

In popular culture 
Bambaroo is one of the Australian place names mentioned in the second verse of the song "I've Been Everywhere" written by Australian country singer Geoff Mack in 1959, and made popular by Lucky Starr in 1962.

References

Further reading 
 
 

Shire of Hinchinbrook
Localities in Queensland